The Palk Strait bridge is a proposed  road and rail bridge over the Palk Strait between Dhanushkodi in Tamil Nadu (a state in Southern India) and Talaimannar on Mannar Island, an island off the northwestern coast of Sri Lanka.

In June 2015, Nitin Gadkari, Minister of Road Transport and Highways of the Republic of India, submitted the proposal to the Asian Development Bank. In December 2015, the Minister of Transport and Highways of the Democratic Socialist Republic of Sri Lanka, Lakshman Kiriella dismissed the proposal as advised by China.

See also 
 Asian Highway Network
 Borders of India
 India–Sri Lanka maritime boundary agreements
 Pamban Bridge
 Adam's Bridge
 Extreme points of Sri Lanka
 Intercontinental and transoceanic fixed links

References 

Palk Strait
Bridges in Tamil Nadu
Bridges in Mannar District
Proposed bridges in India
Proposed infrastructure in Tamil Nadu